Geofrey Massa (born 19 February 1986) is a Ugandan footballer who plays for the KTFF Süper Lig side Küçük Kaymaklı in North Cyprus.

Club career
Born in Jinja, Massa began his career in 2004 with Police FC in the Ugandan Premier League before moving to Egypt side Al-Masry Club in 2005. He played three years in Egypt before moving in 2008 to South African club Jomo Cosmos, for which he played 14 games and scored one goal. In 2008, he left the team to return to Egypt and signed a contract with Itesalat. Massa joined on 14 September 2011 to Telsim Super League club Yenicami Ağdelen SK. On 21 August 2013, he signed a deal with the South African side University of Pretoria F.C.

International career
Massa has made several appearances for the Uganda national football team, his first coming in 2005.

International goals 
Scores and results list Uganda's goal tally first.

References

External links

1986 births
Living people
People from Jinja District
Ugandan footballers
Uganda international footballers
Ugandan expatriate footballers
Association football forwards
Jomo Cosmos F.C. players
Al Masry SC players
University of Pretoria F.C. players
Bloemfontein Celtic F.C. players
Baroka F.C. players
Expatriate footballers in Egypt
Expatriate soccer players in South Africa
Ugandan expatriate sportspeople in South Africa
Ugandan expatriate sportspeople in Egypt
Ugandan expatriate sportspeople in Northern Cyprus
Expatriate footballers in Northern Cyprus
2017 Africa Cup of Nations players
Egyptian Premier League players
El Shams SC players